New England and Macleay was an electoral district of the Legislative Assembly in the Australian state of New South Wales from 1856 to 1859, in the Northern Tablelands region of New England and part of the Mid North Coast region, including the area to the north of the Macleay River. but excluding the area south of the Macleay River which was included in the Counties of Gloucester and Macquarie. To the north was the electorate of Clarence and Darling Downs and to the west the electorate of Liverpool Plains and Gwydir. It elected two members, with voters casting two votes and the first two candidates being elected. It was partly replaced by New England.

Members for New England and Macleay

Election results

1856

1858

1858 by-election

References

Former electoral districts of New South Wales
New England (New South Wales)
1856 establishments in Australia
1859 disestablishments in Australia